Natalia (Natasha) Vladimirovna Reva (born 21 August 1965) is a Russian former professional tennis player.

Active on tour in the 1980s, Reva was a US Open junior doubles finalist. 

In 1984 she appeared in two ties for the Soviet Federation Cup team and was a quarter-finalist at the Virginia Slims of Denver, beating Molly Van Nostrand and Anne Hobbs en route.

Reva's best performance in a grand slam tournament came at the 1985 French Open, where she made the round of 16 in mixed doubles. She also had singles win over Sandra Cecchini at Roland Garros and Pascale Paradis at Wimbledon.

WTA Tour finals

Doubles (0-1)

See also
List of Soviet Union Federation Cup representatives

References

External links
 
 
 

1965 births
Living people
Soviet female tennis players
Russian female tennis players
Friendship Games medalists in tennis